Culross Palace is a late 16th to early 17th century merchant's house in Culross, Fife, Scotland.

The palace, or "Great Lodging", was constructed between 1597 and 1611 by Sir George Bruce, the Laird of Carnock. The house was mainly built in two campaigns. The south block in 1597 and the north building in 1611, the year when George Bruce was knighted. Bruce was a successful merchant who had a flourishing trade with other Forth ports, the Low Countries and Sweden. He had interests in coal mining, salt production, and shipping, and is credited with sinking the world's first coal mine to extend under the sea.

Many of the materials used in the construction of the palace were obtained during the course of Bruce's foreign trade. Baltic pine, red pantiles, and Dutch floor tiles and glass were all used. The exterior boasts the use of crow-stepped gables, including a statue of a veiled woman posing on the gable step.  The palace features fine interiors, with decorative mural and ceiling painting, 17th and 18th-century furniture and a fine collection of Staffordshire and Scottish pottery.

Although it was never a royal residence, James VI visited the Palace in 1617. The palace is now in the care of the National Trust for Scotland who have restored a model seventeenth-century garden, complete with raised beds, a covered walkway and crushed shell paths. The herbs, vegetables and fruit trees planted in the garden are types that were used in the early seventeenth century.

The renaissance paintwork was restored in 1932 for the National Trust and again in the 1990s by conservators from Historic Environment Scotland. On the second floor of the south block a ceiling painting includes 16 emblems adapted from Geffrey Whitney's A Choice of Emblemes (London, 1586). The north block has the fragmentary remains of a scene showing the Judgement of Solomon, and extensive original decorative painting.

References

External links
Culross Palace - official site at National Trust for Scotland
 Engraving of nearby Culross House in 1693 by John Slezer at National Library of Scotland

Houses completed in 1611
Houses in Fife
Scheduled Ancient Monuments in Fife
Historic house museums in Fife
Gardens in Fife
National Trust for Scotland properties
Listed houses in Scotland
Listed palaces in Scotland
Palaces in Fife
1611 establishments in Scotland
Trade in Scotland
Listed buildings in Culross